Tarenna hoaensis is a species of plant in the family Rubiaceae. It is found in Vietnam, Cambodia, and Thailand.

References

hoaensis
Flora of Vietnam
Flora of Cambodia
Flora of Thailand